Maipú is a commune of Chile located in Santiago Province, Santiago Metropolitan Region, integrated into the Greater Santiago conurbation. It was founded on February 16, 1821 and it is the place of the Battle of Maipú (April 5, 1818), where Chile's independence was consolidated. Inhabitants are mostly part of a middle class.

According to the 2017 census, Maipú was the second largest commune in Chile, behind Puente Alto.

Demographics
Of these, 476,552 (99.3%) lived in urban areas and 3,359 (0.7%) in rural areas. The population grew by 82.6% (211,840 persons) between the 1992 and 2002 census.

Stats
Average annual household income: US$45,664 (PPP, 2006)
Population below poverty line: 9.1% (2006)
Regional quality of life index: 76.67, mid-high, 21 out of 52 (2005)
Human Development Index: 0.782, 20 out of 341 (2003)

Administration
As a commune, Maipú is a third-level administrative division of Chile administered by a municipal council, headed by an alcalde who is directly elected every four years. The 2016-2020 alcalde was Cathy Barriga Guerra (UDI). The communal council had the following members:
 Herman Silva Sanhueza (PDC)
 Alejandro Almendares Müller (IND) 
 Marcelo Torres Ferrari (RN)
 Carol Bortnick De Mayo (PPD)
 Antonio Neme Fajuri (UDI)
 Carlos Jara Garrido (PPD)
 Marcela Silva Nieto (PS)
 Ariel Ramos Stocker (PC)
 Abraham Donoso Morales (PDC)
 Mauricio Ovalle Urrea (PDC)

Within the electoral divisions of Chile, Maipú is represented in the Chamber of Deputies by Pepe Auth (PPD) and Mónica Zalaquett (UDI) as part of the 20th electoral district, which consists entirely of the Santiago commune. The commune is represented in the Senate by Guido Girardi Lavín (PPD) and Jovino Novoa Vásquez (UDI) as part of the 7th senatorial constituency (Santiago-West).

The alcalde for the 2021-2025 period is Tomás Vodanovic (RD)

Gallery

References

External links
  Municipality of Maipú
  Maipú a su servicio journal
  MaipuCiudadano.cl, Diario Virtual de Maipú journal
  Todas las noticias de Maipú en un solo lugar journal

Populated places in Santiago Province, Chile
Geography of Santiago, Chile
Communes of Chile
Populated places established in 1821
1821 establishments in Chile